Gail is an unincorporated community in Borden County, Texas, United States. Located at the junction of U.S. Highway 180 and Farm to Market Road 669, it is the county seat of Borden County. As of the 2010 Census, the population was 231.

The town and county are named for Gail Borden, Jr., the inventor of condensed milk.

Gail Mountain is located on the southwest edge of town. The 20th annual Christmas lighting of the star atop Gail Mountain was held on November 29, 2013.

History
Founded in 1891 to coincide with the organization of Borden County, Gail has served as county seat for the duration of its existence. Borden County had remained quite sparsely populated until 1903, when the locally famed "War of Ribbons", inspired by a state-sanctioned land grab, took place. The conflict took its name from the practice of established ranchers displaying their affiliation and identity by way of a blue ribbon on their sleeves, whereas new settlers to the area designated theirs with a similarly placed red ribbon. By 1910, Gail was home to more than 700 residents, and though this would fall to 600 by 1912, the community remained the economic and administrative hub of Borden County. Changes in agricultural practices and patterns, coupled with the impact of the Great Depression, hindered the town and county's prosperity. By 1936, Gail's population had dwindled to 250 residents, and by 1980, it had fallen to around 190. The census of 2010 counted 231 residents in Gail.

The Borden County Jail opened in 1896. Built at a cost of $4,500 by the Diebold Safe and Lock Company, it had  outside walls made of stone from Gail Mountain, and  hardened steel plates in the cell walls and floor.  In 1956, two prisoners objected to Sheriff Sid Reeder's attempt to place them into one of the jail's cells when they noticed a rattlesnake sleeping inside.  A historic marker was placed outside the jail in 1967.

John R. "Rich" Anderson, owner of the  Muleshoe Ranch near Gail, won the 1992 National Cattleman's Association Environmental Stewardship Award. His achievement was also recognized by the Texas House of Representatives.

Geography
Gail is located near the center of Borden County. U.S. Route 180 runs through the town, leading east  to Snyder and west 31 miles to Lamesa.

Climate
Climate type occurs primarily on the periphery of the true deserts in low-latitude semiarid steppe regions. The Köppen climate classification subtype for this climate is BSk (tropical and subtropical steppe climate).

Demographics

2020 census
Note: the US Census treats Hispanic/Latino as an ethnic category. This table excludes Latinos from the racial categories and assigns them to a separate category. Hispanics/Latinos can be of any race. 

As of the 2020 United States census, there were 249 people, 38 households, and 24 families residing in the CDP.

Education
Gail is served by the Borden County Independent School District, and is home to the Borden County High School Coyotes.  The school's Coyote Stadium is a six-man football venue and can seat 350.

Places of interest
Borden County Courthouse - a 1939 one-story brick building with cast concrete detail
Borden County Historical Museum

Gallery

Notable people
 Clinton D. "Casey" Vincent, flying ace, second youngest general in U.S. Air Force history

Trivia
Gail, Texas, is also the name given to a Census Designated Place which includes the town proper.  The town is additionally the locus of the United States Postal Service's Zip Code of 79738.

References

External links

County seats in Texas